Warnakula Jayasuriya Gunawardene Sellaperumage Sumudu Isari Fernando (born 8 February 1981) is a Sri Lankan woman cricketer. She has played for Sri Lanka in three women's ODIs. She was a member of the Sri Lankan team during the 2009 ICC Women's World Twenty20

References

External links 

1981 births
Living people
Sri Lankan women cricketers
Sri Lanka women One Day International cricketers
Cricketers from Colombo